Philotheca cuticularis is a species of flowering plant in the family Rutaceae and is endemic to Queensland. It is a rounded shrub with small, crowded leaves and small white flowers arranged singly on the ends of branchlets.

Description
The ten stamens are free from each other and hairy.

Taxonomy and naming
Philotheca cuticularis was first formally described in 1998 by Paul Wilson in the journal Nuytsia from specimens collected by the Rosemary Purdie in the Grey-Gowan Ranges in 1984.

Distribution
This species of philotheca grows in shallow soil in the Gowan Range of southern Queensland.

Conservation status
This species is classified as of "least concern" under the Queensland Government Nature Conservation Act 1992.

References

cuticularis
Flora of Queensland
Sapindales of Australia
Plants described in 1998
Taxa named by Paul G. Wilson